Louis Jean Desprez (occasionally but incorrectly Jean Louis Desprez) (May 1743–18 March 1804) was a French painter and architect who worked in Sweden during the last twenty years of his life.

Biography
Desprez, who was born in Auxerre in Bourgogne, France. He studied architecture and was awarded the Great Prize of the Académie royale d'architecture in 1770. He traveled frequently to Italy and was associated with Piranesi in Rome. He came to the attention of  King Gustav III of Sweden, who offered him a two-year contract as director of scenic decorations at the new Stockholm Opera founded by the King two years earlier. His first task there was the decorations for the new opera
Gustaf Wasa (with a libretto authored by the King in collaboration with Johan Henric Kellgren and music by Johann Gottlieb Naumann).

As an architect, Desprez  designed in a monumental, neoclassical style influenced by his study of Greek and Roman ruins in the south of Italy and in Sicily. A good example of this is Hämeenlinna Church in Finland - Finland at that time still being part of the Swedish kingdom - completed in 1799. His greatest project was one never realized: the magnificent new palace planned by the King for the Haga Park outside Stockholm. Because of lack of money, only the foundations were ever built and the project was abandoned after the assassination of the King. The smaller "royal pavilion" which stands at Haga was built by  architect, Olof Tempelman.

His most significant completed project was the conservatory building in the new botanical garden in Uppsala, inaugurated after his death on May 13, 1807, the 100th anniversary of Linnaeus's birth. He also built the Villa Frescati in 1791-92 for Gustaf Mauritz Armfelt, after which the whole Frescati area in Stockholm later was named.

Selected works

See also 
 Obelisk at Slottsbacken

References

Other Sources

Nordisk familjebok
 Richard Godfrey Louis-Jean Desprez (Print Quarterly  Vol. 3, No. 3, September 1986, pp. 238–240

1743 births
1804 deaths
People from Auxerre
Swedish people of French descent
18th-century French architects
18th-century French painters
French male painters
Swedish architects
18th-century Swedish painters
18th-century Swedish male artists
Swedish male painters
French neoclassical painters
French neoclassical architects
Prix de Rome for architecture
18th-century French male artists